Taylor Doyle (born 19 December 1992) is an Australian Paralympic athlete with an intellectual and physical disability. She was selected to represent Australia at the 2016 Rio Paralympics in athletics.

Personal
Doyle was born on 19 December 1992 in Sydney, New South Wales. At 8 months old, she was diagnosed with tuberous sclerosis which causes epilepsy and daily seizures.

In 2014 she had epilepsy surgery to reduce the seizures. The surgery was successful, she has had no seizures since 14 April 2014.

However the surgery left her with right side weakness. Through physio and training she is able to compete competitively, in the T38 classification, in Para Athletics.

Athletics
Doyle took up little athletics at the age of nine. Doyle has competed at national and international Special Olympics events. She is classified as a T38 athlete. At the 2013 IPC Athletics World Championships, she finished 9th in the Women's Long Jump F20 prior to epilepsy surgery. At the 2015 IPC Athletics World Championships, she competed in two events and finished 9th in the Women's Long Jump T38 and 7th in the Women's 100m T38. Her time of  14.29 in the 100m was a personal best.

At the 2016 Rio Paralympics, she won a silver medal in the Women's Long Jump T38 with an Australian record jump of 4.62m.

She is a member of the Girraween Athletics Club.

Taylor is coached by Greg Smith, and also trains at NSWIS. She announced her retirement through Twitter in July 2020.

References

External links
 
 
 Taylor Doyle at Athletics Australia
 Taylor Doyle at Australian Athletics Historical Results
 

1992 births
Living people
Australian female long jumpers
Paralympic athletes of Australia
Paralympic silver medalists for Australia
Paralympic medalists in athletics (track and field)
Medalists at the 2016 Summer Paralympics
Athletes (track and field) at the 2016 Summer Paralympics
Intellectual Disability category Paralympic competitors
Commonwealth Games medallists in athletics
Commonwealth Games bronze medallists for Australia
Athletes (track and field) at the 2018 Commonwealth Games
Competitors in athletics with intellectual disability
Medallists at the 2018 Commonwealth Games